Savignia pseudofrontata is a species of sheet weaver found in Korea. It was described by Paik in 1978.

References

Linyphiidae
Arthropods of Korea
Spiders of Asia
Spiders described in 1978